Charles Chester Whitlock (January 22, 1879 – February 13, 1960) was an American college football player and coach and a prosecutor. He served as the head football coach at Indiana State University, then known as Indiana State Normal, in 1901.

Whitlock was a 1900 graduate of DePauw University in Greencastle, Indiana, before arriving in Terre Haute to help coach the Indiana Normal team.

Whitlock later became a prosecutor in Terre Haute, Indiana, where he remained until his death in 1960.

Head coaching record

References

External links
 

1879 births
1960 deaths
19th-century players of American football
DePauw Tigers football players
Indiana State Sycamores football coaches
Indiana lawyers
People from Vermilion County, Illinois
Players of American football from Illinois